Jacob Mordecai ben Judah Löb Löwinsohn (1832 – 13 February 1878) was a Russo-Polish scholar and journalist.

Biography
A son of Rabbi Judah Löb, rosh beit din of Grodno, Löwinsohn was trained in Talmud, and then studied Russian, German, Polish, and French, which he mastered in a very short time. Thus equipped he entered upon a journalistic career. He was a great controversialist, and had heated discussions with Hirsch Kalischer in Ha-Maggid, and with L. J. Shapiro in the Jutrzenka.

About 1868 he passed his examination at the Rabbinical Seminary of Vilna, where he was ordained rabbi; but he never accepted a rabbinate.

Of his first work, Ha-Adam be-Ẓelem Elohim (Königsberg, 1855), only a limited number of copies were printed, which he distributed among his friends. His numerous articles and essays on Jewish literature and science he published under the pen name Y. M. L. ( or ).

References
 

1832 births
1878 deaths
19th-century rabbis from the Russian Empire
Jewish journalists
Jewish writers from the Russian Empire
Journalists from the Russian Empire
People from Grodnensky Uyezd
People from Grodno